WVDO-LD (channel 10), branded on-air as Encanto TV, is a Spanish-language television station licensed to Carolina, Puerto Rico, United States. The station is owned by Make Television Corporation. Its studios are located at Barrio Turabo Arriba in Caguas. The station's transmitter is located at Barrio Cubuy in Canovanas.

Digital television
WVDO-LD's digital signal is multiplexed:

Translators
WVDO-LD is seen all across Puerto Rico on the following translator stations:

 W02CS-D (digital channel 2/RF channel 28) Ponce (serving the southern area)
 W02CT-D (digital channel 2/RF channel 28) Arecibo (serving the northern area)
 W02CU-D (digital channel 2/RF channel 55) Mayaguez (serving the western area)
 W04DV-D (digital channel 4/RF channel 10) Naranjito (serving the eastern area)
 W20DQ-D (digital channel 20/RF channel 10) Luquillo (serving the eastern area)
 W20DR-D (digital channel 20/RF channel 10) Humacao (serving the oriental area)
 W20DS-D (digital channel 20/RF channel 10) Caguas (serving the central area)
 W31DV-D (digital channel 31/RF channel 31) Guayama (serving the southeastern area)
 W35DS-D (digital channel 35/RF channel 35) Yauco (serving the southwestern area)

Logos

References

External links
 
 
 
 
 
 
 
 
 
 

VDO-LD
Television channels and stations established in 2013
Low-power television stations in the United States
Carolina, Puerto Rico
2013 establishments in Puerto Rico